Li Lili (2 June 1915 – 7 August 2005) was a Chinese film actress and singer. Her films Playthings, The Great Road and Storm on the Border were blockbusters of the 1930s and 1940s. She was sometimes called "China's Mae West".

Her films Volcanic Passions (1932), Playthings (Little Toys) (1933), Daybreak (1933), Sports Queen (1934), and The Great Road (The Big Road) (1934) are available with English subtitles on YouTube.

Biography

Li was born Qian Zhenzhen in Beijing, 1915. Her father, Qian Zhuangfei, was a famed secret agent and member of the Chinese Communist Party. In 1927, she moved to Shanghai, where her father encouraged her to join the China Song & Dance Troupe, later renamed Bright Moon Song and Dance Troupe. Li Jinhui, later described as "the Father of Chinese popular music", was the conductor of the troupe and adopted her as his god-daughter, and she changed her name to Li Lili.

The troupe were very popular in 1920s Shanghai. Li Lili, Wang Renmei, Xue Lingxian and Hu Jia were known as Bright Moon's "Four Divas".  After troupe was merged into the Lianhua Film Company in 1931, Li became an actress. She starred in Sun Yu's 1932 Loving Blood of the Volcano, set in the South Seas with plenty of dancing, which allowed Li to play to her strengths. She and Wang Renmei then acted together in Poetry Written on the Banana Leaf.

Sun Yu wrote Queen of Sports and The Big Road for her to star in, and she won audiences with her fashionable and energetic image, gaining the nickname "Sweet Big Sister". Sun Yu's Daybreak (1933) was one of her early star vehicles. Magazines characterized her as being interested in music and books. From 1935 to 1937, she starred in eight more films with the Lianhua Film Company.

Li Lili, together with Wang Renmei and Xu Lai, her former colleagues at the Bright Moon Troupe, were the earliest stars to portray the energetic, wholesome, and sexy "country girl" prototype, which became one of the most popular figures in Chinese cinema, and later inherited by the cinema of Hong Kong.

After war with Japan broke out in 1937, she joined the China Film Studio in Chungking, China's wartime capital. There she met and married Luo Jingyu, a section head, who became head of the studio. In 1939, she filmed Cai Chusheng's Orphan Island Paradise in Hong Kong; it was another hit. Back in Chongqing, she starred in another hit film Storm on the Border, for which she was highly praised.

Li travelled to the United States in 1946, studying acting at The Catholic University of America in Washington, language and singing in New York, and make-up at the University of California. She also observed filmmaking in Hollywood.

She returned to China, and to acting at the Beijing Film Studio. In 1955, she studied at Beijing Film Academy, and later taught in the acting department. Her son, Luo Dan, married the daughter of Marshal Ye Jianying; Ye became China's head of state in the late 1970s.

During the Cultural Revolution, Li and her husband were denounced and tortured on the orders of Mao's wife Jiang Qing. Li had acted with her, and outshone her, in films such as Blood on Wolf Mountain. Li later told her family that she refused to denounce anyone. Luo, however, was killed.

In 1991, she was given the "Special Honour Award" by the Chinese Academy of Motion Picture Arts.

By the end of her life, Li Lili was the last living Chinese movie star from the silent era. She died of a heart attack in Xuanwu Hospital, Beijing on August 7, 2005, aged 90.

Filmography

References

External links
Chinese Film Classics - Li Lili - English-subtitled translations of four of Li's films, video lectures, and other materials
Volcanic Passions (1932) with English subtitles (Chinese Film Classics website)
Daybreak (1933) with English subtitles (Chinese Film Classics website)
Playthings (1933) with English subtitles (Chinese Film Classics website)
The Great Road (1934) with English subtitles (Chinese Film Classics website)
Sports Queen (1934) with English subtitles (Chinese Film Classics website)

Li Lili at the Chinese Movie Database
Li Lili at China's Movie Database 
Li Lili at HKMania.com , homage with photographs

1915 births
2005 deaths
Catholic University of America alumni
Singers from Beijing
20th-century Chinese actresses
Chinese torture victims
Victims of the Cultural Revolution
Chinese film actresses
Singers from Shanghai
Actresses from Shanghai
Actresses from Beijing
20th-century Chinese women singers
Chinese silent film actresses